The 2011–12 Volga season was the 1st season that the club played in the Russian Premier League, the highest tier of football in Russia.

Squad 
As of 24 January 2012, according to the RFPL official website.

Transfers

Winter 2010–11

In:

Out:

Summer 2011

In:

}

Out:

Winter 2011–12

In:

Out:

Competitions

Russian Premier League

Matches

Notes
The Russian Championship tenth match-day fixture Volga vs CSKA was postponed due to a clash with the CSKA's participation in the Russian Cup Final

Table

Russian Premier League – Relegation group

Matches

League table

Relegation playoff

Russian Cup 11–12

Squad statistics

Appearances and goals

|-
|colspan="14"|Players who left the club on loan:
|-
|colspan="14"|Players who appeared for Volga Nizhny Novgorod no longer at the club:

|}

Top scorers

Disciplinary record

References

FC Volga Nizhny Novgorod seasons
Volga Nizhny Novgorod